Matt Anthony (c. 1921 – July 13, 2000) was a Canadian football player who played for the Montreal Alouettes, Ottawa Rough Riders and Saskatchewan Roughriders. He won the Grey Cup with the Rough Riders in 1951. He was born in St. Catharines, Ontario and played junior football there for the St. Catharines Bulldogs prior to joining the Montreal Alouettes in 1946. Anthony later retired to Ottawa where he coached high school, junior (Ottawa Sooners) and university football. He was also a businessman. Anthony died of cancer in 2000. Matt Anthony Field on the campus of the University of Ottawa, opened in 2001, is named in his honour.

References

1921 births
2000 deaths
Montreal Alouettes players
Ottawa Rough Riders players
Players of Canadian football from Ontario
Saskatchewan Roughriders players
Sportspeople from St. Catharines
Ottawa Gee-Gees football coaches